is a Japanese actor.

Career
When Ishida was fifteen, he auditioned in the Junon Superboy Contest for New Actors and won the Photogenic Award.  Acting agencies began expressing interest in Ishida as an actor, who eventually accepted an offer from the company First Production.  After making his film debut, he won the Kinema Junpo Newcomer Award in 2005.

Work

TV drama
 The Gate of Youth·Chapter of Chikuho (TBS,21–22 March 2005) as Shisuke Ibuki
 Koisuru Nichiyoubi (BS-TBS, 25 December 2005) as Yoshimura Huziyoshi
 Gachibaka! (TBS, January to March 2006) as Hukada Hiroyuki
 Tokyo Girl, episode 2 (BS-TBS, 6 August 2006) as Yuichi
 Broccoli (Fuji Television, 20 January 2007) as Ichikawa Keita
 Voice, episode 6 (Fuji Television, 20 February 2009) as Souma Taijin
 Emergency Room 24hours - Series 4 (Fuji Television, 11 August-22 September 2009) as Kudou Ryousuke (Trainee doctor)
 Sayonaraga Ie Nakute (Asahi Broadcasting Corporation, 18 September 2009) as Nagashima Kouji
 Fumou Chitai Episode 3,5,6,13(Fuji Television, 15 October 2009 - 11 March 2010) as Samejima Rondon
 Emergency Room 24hours - Series 2010 Special (Fuji Television, 3 January 2010) as Kudou Ryousuke (Trainee doctor)
 Kamakura Kashi Torimono Hikae (NHK, 12 June 2010) as Kyotaro

Film
 The Samurai I Loved (2005) as Makibun Shirou (young)
 Rough (2006) as Ogata Tsuyoshi
 Night Time Picnic (2006) as Nishiwaki Yuu  (leading actor)
 Kitokito! (2007) as Saitou Yuusuke  (lead actor)
 Out of the Wind (2007) as Yan Suiru
 Gumi. Chocolate. Pine (2007) as Oohashi Kenzou  (lead actor)
 Tokyo Boy (2008) as Karasawa Shuu
 The Chasing World (2008) as Satou Tsubasa  (lead actor)
 Ame no Tsubasa (2008) as Matsumae Yousuke
 Sweet Rain (2008) as Akutsu Shinji
 Boku tachi to chuzai san no 700 nichi senso (2008) as Saijou
 R246 Story (2008) as Maeda Juri
 GS Wonderland (2008) as Kikawa Masao
 Crime or Punishment?!? (2009) as Miyashita
 Girl with Frigidity in Tokyo (2009) as Hide
 Oppai Volleyball (2009) as Nakai (senior member of the volleyball club)
 Battle League Horumo (2009) as Ashiya Man
 Hana no Asuka gumi NEO! (2009) as Teru
 Dear My Love (2009) as Kitajima Susumu
 Rookies (2009) as Hamanaka Taiyou
 Castle Under Fiery Skies (2009) as Shizou
 Shin-san (2010) as Nakaoka Shin'ichi
 The Chasing World 2 (2010) as Satou Tsubasa  (lead actor)
 King Game (Estimated: 2010) as Suzu  (lead actor)
 Gaku: Minna no Yama ("Peak: Everyone's Mountain") (Estimated: 2011) as Akutsu
 Tokyo Tribe (2014) as Kim
 School Lunch of Ashiya City (2022) as Tatsuya Imamura

Dubbing
 The Girl Who Leapt Through Time (animation, 2006) as Chiaki Mamiya (lead)

Others
 The Preparation for picnic (sold from 15 September 2006, a prequel DVD of Night Time Picnic) as Nishiwaki Yuu
 One Draft 1st single "Furusato" (sold from 21 March 2007) - MV appearance
 Funky Monkey Babys 7th Single "Tabidachi (Departure)" (sold from 26 March 2008) - Main cover and MV appearance

Awards
 The Photogenic Award (The 15th Junon Superboy Contest for New Actors) (2002)
 Newcomer Award (The 79th Kinema Junpo Award)
 Newcomer Award (Japanese Movie Critic Grand Prize) (2005)

References

External links
Official Info
Official Page
Takuya Ishida Official Blog
Official MySpace Ishida Takuya

1987 births
Living people
People from Kitanagoya
Actors from Aichi Prefecture
Japanese male film actors
Japanese male voice actors